The 6th Golden Rooster Awards honoring the best in film of 1986, was given in Beijing.

Winners & Nominees

Special Award 
Special Jury Award
Film: 咱们的退伍兵/迷人的乐队
Director: Wang Ping（Revolutionary Sonata of China）

References

External links 
 The 4th Golden Rooster Awards

1986
1986 film awards
1986 in China
1980s in Chinese cinema